Hörður may refer to:

People
Hörður Árnason, Icelandic footballer
Hörður Barðdal, Icelandic water polo player
Hörður Felixson, Icelandic footballer
Hörður Magnússon (disambiguation), several people
Hörður Torfason, Icelandic songwriter
Hörður Vilhjálmsson, Icelandic basketballer

Sports
Knattspyrnufélagið Hörður, Icelandic multi-sport club

Icelandic masculine given names